Sampsa Pellervoinen is a mythological person from Finnish mythology, who sows all vegetation on earth, all the forests, swamps, meadows, and rock lands too. In the original folk poetry the sowing is done with the help of small pieces of sampo. In the Kalevala, Elias Lönnrot changed the order of things so that the sowing happens before the forging of sampo, in the second poem of the Kalevala during the land's creation. Sampsa is commonly described as a slender youth carrying either a bag or a basket around his neck. He appears as a god of fertility, who has to be ritually awakened every summer.

Karelian folklore has preserved possible earlier versions of Sampsa's awakening, where his character is directly connected to old fertility rites. There are many versions of the awakening of Sampsa poem. In the poem, people look for the awakener of Sampsa, so that he would rise to water the plants and fertilize the fields. There are three girls who try to wake him: winter girl, spring girl, and summer girl. Only the last one is successful. In some versions of these poems he inseminates either his sister or his mother to be able to provide fertility for fields and orchards. Feast of Sampsa has been traditionally held on June 29. (at least in Ingria) in connection with the midsummer festivities.

Kaarle Krohn compared Sampsa to Scandinavian fertility deities Frey and Njord. According to Heikki Kirkinen Sampsa's name could be derived from Saint Sampson the Hospitable, a saint of the Eastern Churches. Raymond Chambers has called attention to the possible connection between Sampsa and Scyld Scefing from the Beowulf.

References

Finnish mythology